In algebraic geometry, a Du Val singularity, also called simple surface singularity, Kleinian singularity,  or rational double point, is an isolated  singularity of a complex surface which is modeled on a double branched cover of the plane, with minimal resolution  obtained by replacing the singular point with a tree of smooth rational curves, with intersection pattern dual to a  Dynkin diagram of A-D-E singularity type. They are the canonical singularities (or, equivalently, rational Gorenstein singularities) in dimension 2. They were studied by Patrick du Val and Felix Klein.

The rings of invariant polynomials of these finite group actions were computed by Klein, and are essentially the coordinate rings of the singularities; this is a classic result in invariant theory.

Classification

The possible Du Val singularities are (up to analytical isomorphism):

See also
Brieskorn–Grothendieck resolution
General elephant conjecture

References

External links

Algebraic surfaces
Singularity theory